S. K. Bhatnagar (June 1, 1930 – August 4, 2001) was a former defence secretary of India. He was a key figure of those accused in the Bofors scandal.

He was one of the persons to have been questioned first by the CBI after registering the First Information Report (FIR) in the Bofors pay- off case in January 1990. He was accused of abusing his official authority as the then Defence Secretary to tilt the scales in favour of the Swedish firm for the Rs. 1437-crore contract to supply 155 mm howitzer guns to the Indian Army. The contract with the Government was signed on March 24, 1986, when Rajiv Gandhi was the Prime Minister of India.
 
He was later made governor of Sikkim.

He died in 2001 at the age of 71.

External links

References 

Indian civil servants
Governors of Sikkim
Bofors scandal
1930 births
2001 deaths
Defence Secretaries of India
People charged with corruption